Bastián Eladio San Juan Martínez (born 27 April 1994) is a Chilean footballer who plays as a defender for the Primera B de Chile club Magallanes.

Career

He made his debut in the first team on 14 April 2013, in the match against Rangers de Talca, replacing Boris Sagredo in the minute 78.

In 2012, San Juan was runner-up with O'Higgins, after lose the final against Universidad de Chile in the penalty shoot-out.

In 2013, he won the Apertura 2013-14 with O'Higgins. In the tournament, he played in 2 of 18 matches.

Honours

Club
O'Higgins
Primera División: Apertura 2013-14

Individual

O'Higgins
Medalla Santa Cruz de Triana: 2014

References

External links

1994 births
Living people
Chilean footballers
Association football midfielders
Chilean Primera División players
O'Higgins F.C. footballers
Everton de Viña del Mar footballers
People from Talca